Harold Leeming Sheehan  (1900–1988) was a British physician, pathologist, and professor of pathology.

Biography
Harold Sheehan, whose father was a general practitioner, was the second of thirteen children (6 males and 7 females). After education at Carlisle Grammar School, Harold Sheehan studied medicine at the University of Manchester, graduating MB ChB in 1921. Harold Sheehan began his practice of medicine by joining his elder brother Gerald, who had taken over their father's practice upon the latter's death. Harold Sheehan worked as a general practitioner from 1921 to 1927.

He became in 1927 a demonstrator, and later a lecturer, in the University of Manchester's department of pathology. There the professor of pathology was John Shaw Dunn, who supervised Sheehan's MD thesis (1931) on the deposition of dyes in the mammalian kidney. In 1932 Sheehan graduated MSc with a thesis on renal elimination of injected urea and creatine. By means of a Rockefeller medical fellowship for the academic year 1934–1935, he studied renal function at the Johns Hopkins Medical School's department of pathology.

In 1935 he was appointed director of research at the Glasgow Royal Maternity Hospital and lecturer on pathology. In the years preceding WWII he became an internationally recognised expert on diseases of pregnancy.

He joined the Territorial Army in 1939 and became deputy director of pathology at the allied forces' headquarters in Italy. He was mentioned in dispatches and attained the rank of colonel in the RAMC.

He gained a DSc in 1940 and qualified MRCP in 1941. He was appointed in 1946 to the University of Liverpool's chair of pathology and built up a prestigious department. He acted as a histopathological consultant for the region surrounding Merseyside and monitored obstetrical deaths in the region, promptly performing many autopsies himself.

In 1949, with Victor Kirwan Summers he published an important paper on the syndrome of hypopituitarism.

Sheehan was the president of the section of endocrinology at the October 1960 meeting of the Royal Society of Medicine and gave an address Atypical Hypopituitarism. He retired from the chair of pathology in 1965. From 1965 to 1980 in a room set aside for him at the Liverpool School of Tropical Medicine he studied his case notes and thousands of histopathological specimens accumulated over many years.

He was elected FRCP in 1947, FRCOG in 1949, and FRCPath in 1964. He went on a number of international lecture tours, always accompanied by his wife, who spoke several languages. He was elected a foreign correspondent of the Académie Nationale de Médecine.

In 1934 in Kensington, London, he married Eve Suzette Gertrude Potter (1905–1986). They had no children. Both of them were buried at Allerton Cemetery.

Selected publications

Articles

with J. S. Dunn and W. W. Kay: 

with W. W. Kay: 
with H. Southworth: 
with William Whittle Kay: 
with W. W. Kay: 

with Albert Sharman: 

with A. M. Sutherland: 
with J. Purdon Martin: 
with J. Purdon Martin: 
with James H. Hutchison, J. S. Pippard, and M. H. Gleeson-White: 
with Ninian M. Falkiner: 

with R. T. Cooke: 
with V. K. Summers: 
with V. K. Summers: 
with V. K. Summers: 

with J. C. Davis:

Books
with H. C. Moore: 
with J. B. Lynch: 
with J. C. Davis:

References

 

1900 births
1988 deaths
People from Carlisle, Cumbria
British pathologists
People educated at Carlisle Grammar School
Alumni of the University of Manchester
Academics of the University of Liverpool
Fellows of the Royal College of Physicians
Royal Army Medical Corps officers